Hockessin Friends Meetinghouse is a historic Quaker meeting house and national historic district located at 1501 Old Wilmington Road in Hockessin, New Castle County, in the U.S. state of Delaware. The district encompasses three contributing buildings and one contributing site. It was added to the National Register of Historic Places in 1973.

History 
The first meeting in the area was held at the home of William Cox, in Mill Creek Hundred, New Castle County in about 1730, but not regularly established until 1737. Some of the first members were Cox, John Baldwin and Henry and John Dixon. The name Hockessin was given from an Indian village formerly in the area.

While unsupported by documentation it is believed that the meetinghouse operated as the only school in the area from the late 1700s to the early 1800s. The meetinghouse was also the site of a British troop campsite on September 9, 1777 while troops under the command of Lord Cornwallis headed towards the Battle of the Brandywine.

Structure 
The meeting house was built in 1738 and enlarged in 1745. In 1973 it was a one-story, white plastered stone building with a gable roof. Photographs taken in 2014 show the plaster has been removed from the stone. It has a gable roof with projecting cornice and a crown moulding at the roof line.  The other contributing buildings are a stable and a frame storehouse and a stone house dated to 1817.  The contributing site is the cemetery.

Gallery

References

External links
 The Mill Creek Hundred History Blog: Hockessin Friends Meeting House, July 28, 2010
 

Quaker meeting houses in Delaware
Churches completed in 1738
18th-century Quaker meeting houses
Churches in New Castle County, Delaware
Churches on the National Register of Historic Places in Delaware
Historic districts on the National Register of Historic Places in Delaware
National Register of Historic Places in New Castle County, Delaware
Cemeteries on the National Register of Historic Places in Delaware